Henry Romeyn  (June 1, 1833 – February 21, 1913) was a United States Army officer who received the U.S. military's highest decoration, the Medal of Honor.

Major Romeyn was a companion of the District of Columbia Commandery of the Military Order of the Loyal Legion of the United States.

Medal of Honor citation
Rank and organization: First Lieutenant, 5th U.S. Infantry. Place and date: At Bear Paw Mountain, Montana. 30 September 1877. Entered service at: Michigan. Birth: Galen, New York. Date of issue: 27 November 1894.

Citation text:
Led his command into close-range of the enemy, there maintained his position, and vigorously prosecuted the fight until he was severely wounded.

See also
List of Medal of Honor recipients for the Indian Wars
Medal of Honor
Battle of Bear Paw

References 

United States Army Medal of Honor recipients

American Indian Wars recipients of the Medal of Honor
1833 births
1913 deaths
People from Wayne County, New York
Military personnel from New York (state)
Burials at Arlington National Cemetery